Valeria Pulido Velasco (born 1 January 1990) is a former professional tennis player from Mexico.

Biography
Pulido, who comes from the Mexican state of Morelos, won two singles titles and five doubles titles on the ITF Women's Circuit. She received a wildcard into the doubles event at the 2008 Mexican Open, partnering Melissa Torres Sandoval in her only WTA Tour main-draw appearance.

A right-handed player, Pulido left the tour after the 2008 season to play college tennis in the United States for the USC Trojans.

During her career, she represented Mexico in several international events, including three ties for the Mexico Fed Cup team in 2008, against Colombia, Canada and Paraguay. She won bronze medals for Mexico in the women's doubles at both the 2006 Central American and Caribbean Games and 2011 Summer Universiade. At the 2011 Pan American Games she featured in the singles and doubles competitions, making the quarterfinals of the latter.

ITF finals

Singles (2–1)

Doubles (5–3)

See also
 List of people from Morelos, Mexico

References

External links
 
 
 

1990 births
Living people
Mexican female tennis players
USC Trojans women's tennis players
Sportspeople from Morelos
Competitors at the 2006 Central American and Caribbean Games
Central American and Caribbean Games bronze medalists for Mexico
Tennis players at the 2011 Pan American Games
Pan American Games competitors for Mexico
Universiade medalists in tennis
Universiade bronze medalists for Mexico
Central American and Caribbean Games medalists in tennis
Medalists at the 2011 Summer Universiade
21st-century Mexican women